Louis Nye (May 1, 1913 – October 9, 2005) was an American comedic actor. He was an entertainer to the troops during World War II and is best known for his work on countless television, film and radio programs.

Early years
 
He was born Louis Neistat in Hartford, Connecticut, son of Joseph Neistat and Jennie Sherman. His sister Rose Neistat was born in 1917. Although Nye, who pronounced his given name as Louie, later claimed he was born in 1922, he is listed as age six in the 1920 Hartford County, Connecticut, Federal Census.

Nye's parents were both Yiddish speaking Jews from the Russian Empire. They emigrated to the United States in 1906, and became naturalized citizens in 1911. His father owned a small grocery store, which his wife helped him run. Louis Nye attended Weaver High School, but he was not a good student. "My marks were so low," he explained, "that they wouldn't let me in the drama club. So I went down to WTIC Radio, auditioned, and got on a show."

Radio and television
Nye decided to go to New York City, where he worked in radio, playing various roles on soap operas. He recalled "I still think of myself as an actor. In the radio days, I was busy playing rotten Nazis, rich uncles and emotional juveniles -- the whole span -- and the only time I tried to be funny was at parties."

Nye served in the United States Army during World War II, and because he earned laughs by mimicking other soldiers, he was assigned to Special Services where he met Carl Reiner.  Following his discharge, he returned to New York and began working in live television. He also appeared in several plays on Broadway, and made many appearances on television variety shows such as The Jack Benny Program (including one memorable turn as a crying cab driver), The Jimmy Durante Show, The Pat Boone Chevy Showroom and The Victor Borge Show.

He earned his greatest fame as a regular on The Steve Allen Show, performing with Allen, Don Knotts,  Tom Poston, Pat Harrington Jr., Dayton Allen, Gabriel Dell and Bill Dana. He primarily played urbane, wealthy, and often fey bon vivants; as part of the weekly "Man on the Street" sketches, his characterization of the pretentious country-club braggart Gordon Hathaway, with his catchphrase, "Hi-ho, Steverino," plus Allen's inability to resist bursting into hysterical laughter at his ad-libs, made Nye one of the favorites on Allen's show. When production moved to Los Angeles, Nye went too and became a character actor in Hollywood.

Nye was cast as a guest star on many television series, including Make Room for Daddy; Guestward, Ho!; Burke's Law; The Munsters; Love, American Style; Laverne & Shirley; Starsky and Hutch; Police Woman; Fantasy Island; St. Elsewhere; and The Cosby Show.

Nye played dentist Delbert Gray on several episodes of The Ann Sothern Show from 1960 to 1961, the romantic interest of Olive Smith, played by Ann Tyrrell (1909–1983). Nye also played Sonny Drysdale, the spoiled rich stepson of Milburn Drysdale on The Beverly Hillbillies during the 1962 season. He did six episodes, and received more mail than from anything else he had ever done on television, but the character was dropped. It was rumored that someone in the CBS network, or a sponsor, thought Sonny was too "sissified". However, Nye revived the character briefly during the 1966 season.
During this period, Nye appeared in several television commercials for various products, including Rath brand lunch meats and the Better Business Bureau.

Nye was a member of the cast of Needles and Pins, playing Harry Karp. The sitcom, which starred Norman Fell, ran for 14 episodes in the autumn of 1973.

Nye appeared as a celebrity judge on The Gong Show during the late 1970s.  He also recorded a few comedy LPs, doing a variety of characterizations. Unfortunately, he never had the opportunity to reach his potential in movies. Many of his character roles were little more than cameos. Nevertheless, he performed with Lucille Ball, Bob Hope, Jack Lemmon, Dean Martin, Walter Matthau, Robert Mitchum, Jack Webb and Joanne Woodward, and others. Nye also appeared on the lecture circuit, in concerts and in nightclubs, and did voice work in animation, such as Inspector Gadget with Don Adams.

Last years
Nye never retired. He completed a 24-city tour of the country for Columbia Artists, ending the tour with a two-week stint at the Sahara in Las Vegas. At age 92, he continued to work, appearing in his recurring role of Jeff Greene's father on HBO's Curb Your Enthusiasm from 2000 to 2005.

Nye lived in Pacific Palisades, California with his wife, pianist-songwriter Anita Leonard, who wrote the standard, "A Sunday Kind of Love." Married since the late 1940s, they had a son, artist Peter Nye. Nye was also the great uncle of filmmakers Casey Neistat, Van Neistat and stuntman Dean Neistat.

Nye died of lung cancer. He was cremated and his ashes are interred at Hillside Memorial Park Cemetery in Culver City, California.

Filmography

References

External links
  
  
 

1913 births
2005 deaths
20th-century American comedians
20th-century American male actors
American male comedians
American male film actors
American male stage actors
American male television actors
American male voice actors
Burials at Hillside Memorial Park Cemetery
Deaths from lung cancer in California
Jewish American comedians
Jewish American male actors
Jewish American male comedians
Male actors from Hartford, Connecticut
Riverside Records artists
20th-century American Jews
21st-century American Jews